Solid is the sixth album by the Brooklyn-based soul/funk band Mandrill. Released in 1975, it was their first album on United Artists Records.

Track listing 
All songs written and arranged by Mandrill

"Yucca Jump" 	3:33 	
"Peck Yer Neck" 	3:41 	
"Wind on Horseback" 	6:16 	
"Tee Vee" 	4:58 	
"Solid" 	7:49 	
"Stop & Go" 	3:24 	
"Silk" 	6:32

Personnel 
Carlos Wilson - flute, trombone, guitar, timbales, bass, congas, percussion, vocals, kazoo
Louis Wilson - trumpet, congas, drums, percussion, vocals, kazoo
Ric Wilson - saxophone, percussion, vocals, kazoo
Claude "Coffee" Cave - organ, vibraphone, piano, synthesizer, Fender Rhodes, clavinet, percussion, bass, vocals, kazoo
Tommy Trujillo - guitar, vocals
Andre Locke - drums, vocals
Brian Allsop - bass, vocals

Charts

References

External links
 Mandrill-Solid at Discogs

1975 albums
Mandrill (band) albums
United Artists Records albums
Albums recorded at Studio in the Country